Port Alfred is a small town with a population of just under 26,000 in the Eastern Cape province of South Africa.

History 
Port Alfred was established in the early 1820s by British settlers who were moved into the area by Lord Charles Somerset as there was conflict between the Cape Colony and the Xhosa people. Originally, it was two separate towns (settlers arriving on the west bank in 1820 named their settlement Port Kowie, and those arriving on the east bank named theirs Port Frances).

In 1860, when Queen Victoria's son Prince Alfred visited, the name was changed in his honour.

Port 
In 1839, William Cock and George Hodgkinson started to block the natural river mouth to the east and canalise the present opening to the sea. By 1841 South Africa's first man-made harbour was opened after completion of the stone-lined channel between the ocean and the Kowie river. This allowed high-masted sailing ships with their heavy cargo to dock at the wharf.

Transport 
Port Alfred is located on the junction of the R67 and R72 roads. The R67 connects Port Alfred with the N2 at Makhanda to the north, while the R72 joins the N2 near Colchester to the west and follows the coast to East London in the east.

Education 
Educational establishments based in Port Alfred include Stenden South Africa (a subsidiary campus of Stenden University in the Netherlands), a private Christian school (El Shaddai Christian Academy), the biggest flying training school in the Southern Hemishpere (43 Air School), Mtyhobo Primary School, Dambuza Primary School, Nomzamo High School, Kuyasa Combined School and Port Alfred High School.

References

Further reading

External links 

 
 43 Air School
 River Hotels

Populated places in the Ndlambe Local Municipality
Populated coastal places in South Africa